Little Dorrit is a 1987 film adaptation of the 1857 novel Little Dorrit by Charles Dickens. It was written and directed by Christine Edzard, and produced by John Brabourne and Richard B. Goodwin. The music by Giuseppe Verdi was arranged by Michael Sanvoisin.

The film stars Derek Jacobi as Arthur Clennam, Alec Guinness as William Dorrit, and Sarah Pickering in the title role. A huge cast of seasoned British and Irish stage and film actors was assembled to play the dozens of roles, including Simon Dormandy, Joan Greenwood, Roshan Seth, Miriam Margolyes, Cyril Cusack and Max Wall. Pickering, in contrast, had never acted on screen; she was cast after writing to the production team claiming to 'be' Little Dorrit. It remains her only screen acting role.

Production
Little Dorrit lasts nearly six hours and was released in two parts, of approximately three hours each. The first part was subtitled Nobody's Fault, an allusion to one of Dickens' proposed titles for the original novel, and the story developed from the perspective and experiences of the Arthur Clennam character. The second film, titled Little Dorrit's Story, took many of the same events and presented them through the eyes of the heroine. Together they represented overlapping chronicles.

Sands Films, the production company that made the film, is run by Christine Edzard, the screenwriter and director, and her husband Richard B. Goodwin.

Reception

Variety was positive, noting that "what she (Edzard) has accomplished on a small budget is astounding" and describing Alec Guinness's 'William Dorrit' and Derek Jacobi's 'Arthur Clennan' as "quite brilliant."  The reviewer thought the film's six hours running time allowed for "full characterization and depth of story", adding that the way the film tells the same story through two different characters "allows charming reinterpretations of certain scenes", presenting "a fully rounded piece as never usually found in the cinema." The painted sets were also mentioned for providing "rich theatrical texture while not deflecting from the story."

The New York Times noted "The cast is spectacular."

The film was nominated for two Oscars: Actor in a Supporting Role (Alec Guinness) and Writing (Screenplay Based on Material from Another Medium) (Christine Edzard). Miriam Margolyes won the LA Critics Circle Award for Best Supporting Actress for her role as Flora Finching.

The Region Two DVD was released in the UK on 27 October 2008.

Full cast

In addition, minor roles were played by: Michael Elphick, Arthur Blake, Eleanor Bron, Heathcote Williams, John Savident, Betty Marsden, Liz Smith, Brian Pettifer, Kathy Staff, Ian Hogg, Tony Jay, Julia Lang, Christopher Hancock, Malcolm Tierney, John Warner, Harold Innocent, Edward Burnham, Gerald Campion, Nadia Chambers and David Thewlis.

See also 
List of longest films by running time

References

External links
 
 

 

 
Sands Films (production company and DVD)
Little Dorrit film trailer

1987 films
British historical drama films
Films based on Little Dorrit
1980s historical drama films
Golan-Globus films
Films released in separate parts
1987 drama films
1980s English-language films
1980s British films